Meteor is a designation of a series of Polish sounding rockets. The Meteor rockets were built between 1963 and 1974.

Meteor was the one and two stages meteorological rockets, using the solid fuel, constructed for the research of the top layers of terrestrial atmosphere, also directions and forces of winds from 18 to more than 50 km above the Earth surface. These rockets were designed by Polish engineers of Warsaw Aviation Institute (among them was Professor Jacek Walczewski and engineer Adam Obidziński) and had been produced by WZK-Mielec factory.

History 

The first launching site of the sounding rockets in Poland was Błędowska Desert, where since 1958 to 1963, the rockets of different types had been launched; among others RD and Rasko. During a flight, the biological experiment with earlier trained two white mouses was conducted (the RM-2D rocket achieved the altitude of 1580 meters).
 
Since 1965 to April 1970, the Meteor-1 rockets had been launched from "spaceport" located 5 km from Ustka town. This programme had been continued to 1974, when rockets were bearing out from the area of experimental center founded there during the years of the Second World War, located on west side of Łeba town. Currently, it is in the museum (the starting place with ramp and the radar bases).

There was 224 flights of "Meteor-1" rocket series (including prototypes). The valuable data both meteorological and connected with rocket techniques were found as the result of these researches.

The "Meteor-1", "Meteor-2H" and "Meteor 2K" (the largest civilian rocket developed in Poland) were single-stage rockets. The "Meteor 3" was a two-stage rocket, developed from "Meteor 1".

Meteor rockets had been launched from Łeba and Ustka. Five Meteor rockets missions were conducted around 1970 from Zingst, in the former Eastern Germany. The programme of flights of Meteor-2 was finished during the same year, when Poland started to participate in Interkosmos research, using the Vertical rockets.

Meteor-1

One stage, but two units rocket called "Meteor-1" had the length of 2470 mm and the initial mass of 32.5 kg. The flight lasted for 80 second and reaching at the peak altitude of 36.5 km. The motor ignite for 2–3 seconds and reached the maximum velocity of 1100 meters per second. In 1965, 6 rockets of "Meteor-1" type was launched and after this time: 12 in 1966, 40 in 1967, 45 in 1968, 36 in 1969, 34 in 1970 and 4 in 1971.

The charge of metal dipoles was released by rockets and this material had later been observed on radar screens. It was the base of derivation of winds strength in the stratosphere and winds directions in the same atmospheric layer. After experiments that had been conducted in the years 1965–1966, during "The Year of the Quiet Sun", a cyclic pattern of variation in case of directions of these atmospheric flows was concluded.

Meteor-2

The one stage "Meteor 2K" was the most advanced version of the Meteor rocket. On 7 October 1970, the flight took place and reached the altitude of 90 kilometers. This rocket had been used as sounding of the ionosphere, reaching the level of boundary between D and E layers. 10 flights of this version were realized, when the measurements of temperature were made. The length of rocket frame is 4.5 meters and some are more longer than an English rocket, Petrel (in service since 1968). The "Meteor-2" had not been produced in serial way. The cost of this rocket prototype was eight times higher than for the copy of "Meteor-1". The weight of useful charge, in form of "RAMZES" recovery probe, is 10 kg.

Meteor-3

A two-stage rocket called "Meteor-3" was a developed version of "Meteor-1". The range of flight was increased and the rocket gained possibility of launching of few charges of dipoles. It can reach at ceiling altitudes between 67 and 74 kilometers. An idea of version "S" project had been considered. This model could be launch from airplane frame, about 5 kilometers above the surface.

Meteor-4

"Meteor-4" rocket has ten times more thrust than "Meteor-2". This version could reach above 100 km. According to design, this rocket is longer than 5 meters and had the initial total mass of 407 kg with useful weight of 10 kg. 175 seconds into the flight, it would reach at the altitude of 120 kilometers.

Launch Log

An incomplete list of Meteor launches

External links
 https://web.archive.org/web/20060629202124/http://astronautix.com/lvs/meteor.htm
 https://web.archive.org/web/20070927120852/http://www.rocketservices.co.uk/spacelists/sounding_rockets/decades/1965-1969.htm
 https://web.archive.org/web/20070927120838/http://www.rocketservices.co.uk/spacelists/sounding_rockets/decades/1970-1974.htm

Sounding rockets of Poland
Meteorological instrumentation and equipment
Science and technology in Poland